Franklin Jeffrey Williams (born May 7, 1943) is a former American football player who played as a halfback in the National Football League (NFL) in 1966. Born in High Springs, Florida, he attended A. L. Mebane High School and Oklahoma State University, playing 20 games for the Oklahoma State Cowboys between 1963 and 1964. He made a total of 90 rushing attempts for 357 yards and one touchdown, and 21 receptions for 190 yards and two touchdowns. He was undrafted going into the NFL, winding up with the Minnesota Vikings in the 1966 season. He played three games and recorded one rushing attempt for two yards and a fumble, four punt returns for −2 yards, and three kickoff returns for 61 yards.

References

1943 births
Living people
People from High Springs, Florida
Players of American football from Florida
American football halfbacks
Oklahoma State Cowboys football players
Minnesota Vikings players